Afia Efere  is a Nigerian soup popular amongst the Efik tribe, the soup is also known as white soup due to absence of palm oil in it.

Origin 
White soup originate from the Efik tribe and it is similar to the Igbo soup 'Ofe Nsala' except that fewer ingredients is used and the latter does not contain uyayak, rather Ofe Nsala' contain Utazi and Ogiri.  Calabar people are mostly of the Efik tribe.

Overview 
The oilless soup is made up two main meats which goat or  chicken and this is why it got additional names "Afiaefereebot" and  "afiaefereunen" meaning white soup with goat and white soup with chicken respectively.

Other ingredients used in making the soup include uyayak, Ehu (Calabash nutmeg), uziza leaves, crayfish etc.

See also 
Nsala soup

Efik people

Ikot Udo Abia

References 

Igbo cuisine
Nigerian soups